Rishi Dayaram and Seth Hassaram National College and Seth Wassiamull Assomull Science College, popularly known as R. D. National College or simply as National College, is an education institute on Linking Road in Bandra, Mumbai, Maharashtra, India. It is affiliated to the University of Mumbai and the first of twenty-four institutions established and managed by the Hyderabad (Sind) National Collegiate Board (HSNCB).

History 
National College is the first college of the Hyderabad(Sind) National Collegiate board. Today this Board has over 22 educational institutions catering to students from all background. it was established in Independent India in 1949 under the leadership of Late Principal M. Kundnani and Late Barrister H. G. Advani - who had migrated from Sind, Pakistan to Mumbai after Independence. The college, however, traces its origin to D. G. National College, which was established in Hyderabad (Sind) in 1922 with the support and guidance of Dr. Annie Besant and Rishi Dayaram Gidumal. After the Partition of India, it got repositioned to Bandra (West), Mumbai. The college originally catered to the educational needs of the refugee community, and later the local population joined the college in large numbers. A variety of courses are offered by R D National College, ranging from Engineering, pharmacy and Education to Arts Science and Commerce.

Campus 
The infrastructural facilities of the college includes multiple chemistry and physics laboratories, multimedia classrooms for academic activities, a multipurpose, badminton courts and a floodlit multi Sports-Basketball / Throw ball / Volleyball Court for sports activities. The college campus has a canteen attached with variety of food items. The college has a number of security guards for the security purpose of the students. The classes are non air conditioned.

The college has a  Gymkhana the facilities include a full set of weight and powerlifting equipment treadmill and exelcycle. The Gymkhana also has facilities and equipments for many games.

It has Auditorium with a capacity of 600. The auditorium is fully air conditioned.

Courses 
Pre Degree (Junior College) plus two levels and the Degree level in the Science, Arts and Commerce streams.

The college is developed up to the doctorate level and offers a Doctor of Philosophy (Ph.D) in Chemistry

At the Postgraduate level, following courses are offered :

 Master of Science in Physics, Chemistry, Computer Science, Information Technology and Biotechnology.
 Master of Commerce
 Master of Arts in English and Psychology.

At the graduate level, the institute offers the following courses :

 Bachelor of Arts (B.A.) in specializations including Hindi, English, Economics, History, Political Science and Psychology.
 Bachelor of Commerce in Accounting and Finance.
 Bachelor of Science (B.Sc.) in specializations of Botany, Biology, Bio-Technology, Computer Science, Physics, Chemistry, Computer Science, Mathematics, Information Technology etc. 
 The college offers a standalone course in Bachelor of Mass Media (BMM) which is one of the finest in India and Bachelor of Management Studies (BMS).

At the Junior College level, the institute offers courses in Science, Commerce and Arts.

There are around 240 seats in Commerce, 240 seats in Arts, and 600 in Science. The Honours Programme encourages students to research topics outside their curriculum. The Mentor system has one teacher mentoring 20 students. A credit system encourages students to take up extra-curricular activities. There are also UGC-sponsored certificate courses in Hindustani Classical Music, Odissi dance, Heritage Management, Beauty care, and Finishing school. National College is strict in terms of attendance and if it falls below 70%, the college authorities have the right to withhold a student's hall ticket. RD National College also has an active placement cell that provides information and guidance to the students regarding jobs and recruitment procedures in various esteemed companies.

Notable alumni 
 S. P. Hinduja, billionaire industrialist
 Amjad Khan, actor and director
 Divine (rapper), rapper
 Vikrant Massey, actor
 Tanmay Bhat, comedian
 Nagma, Actress and Politician
 Allu Sirish, Telugu Actor
 Lavanya Tripathi, Telugu Actress
 Pranali Rathod, TV Actress

References

External links 
 

Universities and colleges in Mumbai
Educational institutions established in 1922
1922 establishments in India

 Junior College Website